Viñasutil Airport is an airport serving the Viña Sutil winery,  east of Peralillo, a town in the O'Higgins Region of Chile.

See also

Transport in Chile
List of airports in Chile
Aeródromo Viña Sutil Spanish Wikipedia

References

External links
OpenStreetMap - Viñasutil
OurAirports - Viñasutil Airport
FallingRain - Viñasutil Airport

Airports in Chile
Airports in O'Higgins Region